Little Lord Fauntleroy is a 1936 drama film based on the 1886 novel of the same name by Frances Hodgson Burnett. The film stars Freddie Bartholomew, Dolores Costello, and C. Aubrey Smith. The first film produced by David O. Selznick's Selznick International Pictures, it was the studio's most profitable film until Gone with the Wind. The film is directed by John Cromwell.

The film was critically well received and is now in the public domain. In 2012 it was released on Blu-ray Disc by Kino Lorber, following a restoration by the George Eastman House Motion Picture Department.

Plot
Young Cedric "Ceddie" Errol (Freddie Bartholomew) and his widowed mother, whom he calls "Dearest" (Dolores Costello), live frugally in 1880s Brooklyn after the death of his father. Cedric's prejudiced English grandfather, the Earl of Dorincourt (C. Aubrey Smith), had long ago disowned his son for marrying an American.

The earl sends his lawyer Havisham (Henry Stephenson) to bring Ceddie to England. As the earl's sons are all dead, Ceddie is the only remaining heir to the title. Mrs. Errol accompanies her son to England, but is not allowed to live at Dorincourt castle. For Cedric's happiness, she does not tell him it is because of his grandfather's bigotry. The earl's lawyer is impressed with the young widow's wisdom. However, the earl expresses skepticism when Mr. Havisham informs him that Cedric's mother will not accept an allowance from him.
 
Cedric soon wins the hearts of his stern grandfather and everyone else. The earl hosts a grand party to proudly introduce his grandson to British society, notably his sister Lady Constantia Lorridaile (Constance Collier).

After the party, Havisham informs the earl that Cedric is not the heir apparent after all. American Minna Tipton (Helen Flint) insists her son Tom (Jackie Searl) is the offspring of her late husband, the earl's eldest son. Heartbroken, the earl accepts her apparently valid claim, though Tom proves to be a rather obnoxious lad.

Ceddie's friend Dick Tipton (Mickey Rooney) recognises Minna from her newspaper picture. He takes his brother Ben, Tom's real father, to England and disproves Minna's claim. The earl apologises to Ceddie's mother and invites her to live with the delighted Ceddie on his estate.

Cast
 
The cast of Little Lord Fauntleroy is listed at the American Film Institute Catalog of Feature Films.

Uncredited

Production
Little Lord Fauntleroy was the first film produced by Selznick International Pictures, created by David O. Selznick when he left Metro-Goldwyn-Mayer. While he was still at MGM Selznick purchased the rights to the story from Mary Pickford for $11,500 and secured the performance of his David Copperfield discovery, Freddie Bartholomew. It was the final film for which Sophie Wachner designed costumes.

Ben Hecht, Richard Schayer and Selznick himself polished the screenplay commissioned from Hugh Walpole. Directed by John Cromwell, the film was shot during the last two months of 1935. Made within its budget of $500,000, the film's final cost was $590,000.

The film was released through United Artists after a world premiere March 4, 1936, at Foundation Hospital in Warm Springs, Georgia.

Box office
By 1939, Little Lord Fauntleroy earned an estimated profit of $447,000. It was Selznick International Pictures' most profitable film until Gone With the Wind.

Critical response
Frank S. Nugent reviewed the film for the New York Times on April 3, 1936, and gave it a favorable review.

Home media
Long in the public domain, Little Lord Fauntleroy was released on DVD and Blu-ray Disc by Kino Lorber in 2012. The film was remastered by the George Eastman House Motion Picture Department, from Selznick's personal print.

DVD Talk wrote: "This Kino Classics release, while far from perfect, sources an original 35mm nitrate print resulting in a better than acceptable presentation. And unless original film elements turn up, this is probably the best Little Lord Fauntleroy is going to look for the foreseeable future. Highly recommended".

See also
 Little Lord Fauntleroy (1921)
 Little Lord Fauntleroy (1980)
 Little Lord Fauntleroy, the book

References

External links

 
 
 
 
 

1936 films
1936 drama films
American drama films
American black-and-white films
Films based on American novels
Films based on British novels
Films based on works by Frances Hodgson Burnett
Films set in the 1880s
Selznick International Pictures films
United Artists films
Films directed by John Cromwell
Films produced by David O. Selznick
Films scored by Max Steiner
1930s English-language films
1930s American films